The John Young Museum of Art is located on the campus of the University of Hawaii at Manoa in Krauss Hall at 2500 Dole Street
Honolulu, HI 96822.

The 2,738 square foot teaching museum located at the University of Hawaiʻi at Mānoa, in Honolulu, consists of two exhibition galleries (the Beverly Willis gallery and the Michael J. Marks gallery) and a state-of-the-art object study center housing works of Asian art, Native Hawaiian (Kanaka Maoli) art, and Pacific art. Most of the works in its permanent collection were donated by the American/Hawaiian artist John Chin Young (1909–1997). The museum is housed near the Dole Street entrance to the campus in a historic former pineapple research building. It has a large courtyard where public events are held. 

Since 2019, the museum has been directed by Dr. Maika Pollack. 

The museum is open noon to 4:00pm Sunday to Friday during Fall and Spring semesters. The museum does not charge admission and is open to the public. Parking in front of the museum on campus is free on Sundays.

References
 Burlingame, Burl, Reflections of an artist, John Young Museum of Art at the University of Hawaii at Manoa houses precious pieces handed down by its namesake, Honolulu Star-Bulletin, July 30, 1999.
Andrew Russeth, "Art Historian and Curator Maika Pollack to Lead University of Hawaii’s Art Spaces," ArtNews, May 1, 2019. https://www.artnews.com/art-news/news/art-historian-and-curator-maika-pollack-to-lead-university-of-hawaiis-art-spaces-12467/

External links 
 

Art museums established in 1999
University of Hawaiʻi
Museums in Honolulu
University museums in Hawaii
Art museums and galleries in Hawaii
Asian art museums in Hawaii
Tribal art
1999 establishments in Hawaii